The Left Liberals was a Greek left-wing political party.

It was founded in 1949 by two former Major Generals of the Greek People's Liberation Army and members of the National Liberation Front, Neokosmos Grigoriadis and Stamatis Hatzibeis. In the Greek legislative election of 1950, the party formed the Democratic Alignment, a coalition with the Socialist Party of Greece. In August 1951 the party merged with other small left-wing parties into United Democratic Left

References 

Defunct socialist parties in Greece
Political parties established in 1949
1949 establishments in Greece
Political parties disestablished in 1951
1951 disestablishments in Greece
Radical parties